Ágh is a Hungarian surname. Notable people with the surname include:

Adalbert Agh (born 1945), Romanian rower
István Agh (1709–1786), Hungarian Unitarian bishop
István Ágh (poet) (born 1938), Hungarian poet
István Ágh (sport shooter) (born 1970), Hungarian sport shooter
Norbert Ágh (born 1970), Hungarian swimmer
Olivér Ágh (born 1975), Hungarian swimmer
Péter Ágh (born 1982), Hungarian politician
Zoltán Ágh (born 1991), Slovak footballer
Dávid Ágh (born 1987),
clinical psychologist, psychoanalytical psychotherapist

Hungarian-language surnames